Epictia vellardi is a species of snake in the family Leptotyphlopidae. The species is endemic to South America.

Etymology
The specific name, vellardi, is in honor of French herpetologist Jehan Albert Vellard, who for most of his life lived and worked in South America.

Geographic range
E. vellardi is found in Argentina, Brazil, and Paraguay.

Reproduction
E. vellardi is oviparous.

References

Further reading
Adalsteinsson SA, Branch WR, Trape S, Vitt LJ, Hedges SB (2009). "Molecular phylogeny, classification, and biogeography of snakes of the family Leptotyphlopidae (Reptilia, Squamata)". Zootaxa 2244: 1-50. (Epictia vellardi, new combination).
Cabral H, Netto F (2016). "Geographic Distribution: Epictia vellardi ". Herpetological Review 47 (1): 83.
Laurent RF (1984). "El género Leptotyphlops en la colección de la Fundación Miguel Lillo ". Acta Zoologica Lilloana 38 (1): 29–34. (Leptotyphlops vellardi, new species). (in Spanish).

Epictia
Reptiles of Argentina
Reptiles described in 1984